Earl of Forfar is a title that has been created twice, once in the Peerage of Scotland and once in the Peerage of the United Kingdom. The name of the earldom refers to Forfar, the county town of Angus, Scotland. The current holder is Prince Edward, son of Elizabeth II and brother of Charles III.

History
The title was first created in 1661 in the Peerage of Scotland as a subsidiary title to the Earldom of Ormond. This first creation of the title became extinct in 1715.

The dignity of Earl of Forfar in the Peerage of the United Kingdom was granted in 2019 to Prince Edward, Earl of Wessex, on the occasion of his 55th birthday. This earldom was given in addition to the two titles (Earl of Wessex and Viscount Severn) that he received on his wedding day and affords Prince Edward and his wife Sophie a Scottish title to use when in Scotland. Unlike his brother (Prince Andrew, Earl of Inverness) and nephews (Prince William, Earl of Strathearn and Prince Harry, Earl of Dumbarton), Prince Edward did not receive a Scottish title on the occasion of his marriage.

The County of Forfar, renamed Angus in 1928, contains Glamis Castle, the seat of the Earls of Strathmore and Kinghorne, from whom Prince Edward's grandmother Queen Elizabeth The Queen Mother was descended.

In July 2019, the Earl and Countess visited Forfar on their first official visit to the town since the Queen granted the title in March 2019. He was presented with 'Earl of Forfar' tartan, to decorate the Earl and Countess, by a town firm – the Strathmore Woollen Company. The weave is based on the existing Forfar tartan, which it designed in 2004 on the colours from the Forfar coat of arms. The geometry remains virtually the same, but the colours have been strengthened, with Azure blue replaced by the St Andrew's blue of the Scottish flag, and white yarns replaced by a brown to reflect the rich agriculture of the surrounds.

The couple visited Forfar again in the summer of 2021.

Earls of Forfar, first creation (1661)
Subsidiary title was Lord Wandell and Hartside (Peerage of Scotland, 1661).
 Archibald Douglas, 1st Earl of Forfar and 2nd Earl of Ormond (1653–1712), younger son of the 1st Earl of Ormond.
 Archibald Douglas, 2nd Earl of Forfar and 3rd Earl of Ormond (1692–1715), only son of the above. On his death without issue in 1715, both earldoms became extinct.

Earls of Forfar, second creation (2019)

| Prince EdwardHouse of Windsor2019–presentalso: Duke of Edinburgh (2023), Earl of Wessex (1999), Viscount Severn (1999)
| 
| 10 March 1964Buckingham Palace, Londonson of Queen Elizabeth II and Prince Philip
| 19 June 1999Sophie Rhys-Jones2 children
|  now  old
|-
|}

Line of succession

   Prince Edward, Duke of Edinburgh (b. 1964)
 (1)  James, Earl of Wessex (b. 2007)

Notes

References

1661 establishments in Scotland
Noble titles created in 1661
1715 disestablishments in Scotland
2019 establishments in the United Kingdom
Noble titles created in 2019
Extinct earldoms in the Peerage of Scotland
Earldoms in the Peerage of the United Kingdom